Fruitridge Pocket is a census-designated place in Sacramento County, California. The 2010 United States census reported Fruitridge Pocket's population was 5,800.

Prior to the 2010 United States census, Fruitridge Pocket was grouped with Parkway and Lemon Hill in the Parkway-South Sacramento, California CDP.

Geography
According to the United States Census Bureau, the CDP covers an area of 0.6 square miles (1.6 km2), all of it land.

Demographics

The 2010 United States Census reported that Fruitridge Pocket had a population of 5,800. The racial makeup of Fruitridge Pocket was 1,704 (29.4%) White, 1,047 (18.1%) African American, 105 (1.8%) Native American, 1,113 (19.2%) Asian, 67 (1.2%) Pacific Islander, 1,317 (22.7%) from other races, and 447 (7.7%) from two or more races. Hispanic or Latino of any race were 2,345 persons (40.4%).

The Census reported that 5,589 people (96.4% of the population) lived in households, 211 (3.6%) lived in non-institutionalized group quarters, and 0 (0%) were institutionalized.

There were 1,670 households, out of which 773 (46.3%) had children under the age of 18 living in them, 606 (36.3%) were opposite-sex married couples living together, 437 (26.2%) had a female householder with no husband present, 165 (9.9%) had a male householder with no wife present.  There were 178 (10.7%) unmarried opposite-sex partnerships, and 15 (0.9%) same-sex married couples or partnerships. 336 households (20.1%) were made up of individuals, and 102 (6.1%) had someone living alone who was 65 years of age or older. The average household size was 3.35.  There were 1,208 families (72.3% of all households); the average family size was 3.88.

The population was spread out, with 1,826 people (31.5%) under the age of 18, 618 people (10.7%) aged 18 to 24, 1,572 people (27.1%) aged 25 to 44, 1,286 people (22.2%) aged 45 to 64, and 498 people (8.6%) who were 65 years of age or older.  The median age was 29.7 years. For every 100 females, there were 98.4 males.  For every 100 females age 18 and over, there were 100.3 males.

The homeowner vacancy rate was 3.6%; the rental vacancy rate was 7.6%.  2,263 people (39.0% of the population) lived in owner-occupied housing units and 3,326 people (57.3%) lived in rental housing units.

References

Census-designated places in Sacramento County, California
Census-designated places in California